The 1973 Rothmans Canadian Open – Men's singles was an event of the 1973 Rothmans Canadian Open tennis tournament that was played at the Toronto Lawn Tennis Club in Toronto in Canada rom August 20 through August 26, 1973. The draw comprised 64 players and 16 players were seeded. Ilie Năstase was the defending champion but did not participate in this edition. Third-seeded Tom Okker won the singles title, defeating fourth-seeded Manuel Orantes in the final, 6–3, 6–2, 6–1. He earned $15,000 first-prize money as well as 60 ranking points which moved him into third position on the Grand Prix ranking.

Seeds

Draw

Finals

Top half

Section 1

Section 2

Bottom half

Section 3

Section 4

References

External links
 ITF tournament edition details

Rothmans Canadian Open
1973 Grand Prix (tennis)